
Gmina Lubasz is a rural gmina (administrative district) in Czarnków-Trzcianka County, Greater Poland Voivodeship, in west-central Poland.

Villages
Gmina Lubasz contains the villages and settlements of Antoniewo, Bończa, Bzowo, Dębe, Elżbiecin, Goraj, Jędrzejewo, Kamionka, Klempicz, Krucz, Kruteczek, Lubasz, Miłkówko, Miłkowo, Nowina, Prusinowo, Sławno, Sokołowo and Stajkowo.

Neighbouring gminas
Gmina Lubasz is bordered by the town of Czarnków and by the gminas of Czarnków, Obrzycko, Połajewo, Wieleń and Wronki.

References
Polish official population figures 2006

Lubasz
Czarnków-Trzcianka County